The West Side Combined Sewer Overflow Tunnel (also West Side Big Pipe) is a tunnel in Portland, Oregon, United States. It receives and stores overflow from the combined sewer system before it can reach the Willamette River.

The tunnel receives flows that might otherwise reach the river.  Instead, the CSO tunnel transports them to the Swan Island Pump Station. Portland's 1930s sewer design combined street and surface runoff with sewage in a common system that was overwhelmed during heavy precipitation.  The original system handled overflows by sending excess flow into the river.

It passes under the Willamette River between the NW Nicolai Street shaft to the confluent vertical shaft on Swan Island, which also receives the East Side Big Pipe. From Nicolai, it travels roughly south close to Front Avenue. There are vertical shafts at Upshur, Ankeny, and Clay streets.

The project is a part of the Willamette River combined sewer overflow expansion program.  Construction occurred from November 2002 to September 2006, and the project became fully operational in December 2006.

A 20-year series of related CSO projects, including the West Side Big Pipe, culminated in late 2011 with completion of the East Side Big Pipe. The combined projects reduced the city's sewer overflows into the Willamette River by 94 percent and into the Columbia Slough by more than 99 percent. The total cost of the projects, about $1.4 billion, is being financed over time through additions to the Portland sewer rates. Almost no financial support for the projects came from state or Federal governments.

See also

 List of crossings of the Willamette River

References 

2006 establishments in Oregon
Sewerage infrastructure in the United States
Tunnels in Oregon
Buildings and structures in Portland, Oregon